John Connell Laycock (2 December 1818 – 30 November 1897) was an Australian politician.

He was born in Sydney to storekeeper and pastoralist Thomas Laycock and Margaret Connell. He owned land at Yamba. On 1 February 1843 he married Mary Jane Simpson, with whom he had four children. In 1859 he was elected to the New South Wales Legislative Assembly for Central Cumberland. He transferred to Clarence in 1864, but resigned in 1866. Laycock died at Parramatta in 1897.

References

 

1818 births
1897 deaths
Members of the New South Wales Legislative Assembly
19th-century Australian politicians